Minuscule 583 (in the Gregory-Aland numbering), ε 124 (von Soden), is a Greek minuscule manuscript of the New Testament, on parchment. Palaeographically it has been assigned to the 11th century. The manuscript has complex contents. It was labeled by Scrivener as 452.

Description 

The codex contains a complete text of the four Gospels on 285 leaves (size ). The text is written in one column per page, 21 lines per page.

The first page of the Gospel and some other portions of the manuscript are decorated in gold, with luxurious miniatures.

Text 

The Greek text of the codex is a representative of the Byzantine text-type. Aland placed it in Category V.
According to the Claremont Profile Method it represents the textual family Kx in Luke 1 and Luke 20. In Luke 10 no profile was made. It creates textual cluster with the minuscule 112.

History 

The manuscript once belonged to the Bonsivi family, then it was transferred to the public library at Lucca.

The manuscript currently housed in at the Biblioteca Palatina in Parma (Ms. Pal. 5).

See also 

 List of New Testament minuscules
 Biblical manuscript
 Textual criticism

Notes

References

Further reading 

 

Greek New Testament minuscules
11th-century biblical manuscripts